Epectasis similis is a species of beetle in the family Cerambycidae. It was described by Charles Joseph Gahan in 1895. It is known from Saint Vincent and the Grenadines, Grenada, Martinique, Guadeloupe, and Dominica.

References

Pteropliini
Beetles described in 1895